Milutin Petrović (Serbian Cyrillic: Милутин Петровић; 1791–1861) was one of the vojvodas (military commanders) of the Serbian Revolutionary forces in the First Serbian Uprising against the Ottoman Empire, in charge of the Negotin area. His nom de guerre was Era. He and his brother Hajduk Veljko were listed as one of the heroes of the Uprising.

See also
 List of Serbian Revolutionaries

References

Sources

External links

1861 deaths
1791 births
People from Zaječar
Military personnel from Požarevac
18th-century Serbian people
19th-century Serbian people
People of the First Serbian Uprising
Serbian revolutionaries
Serbian soldiers
Timok Valley
Characters in Serbian epic poetry
Hajduks
Burials in Požarevac
Burials at Serbian Orthodox monasteries and churches